Susanne Bratli (born 10 June 1966) is a Norwegian politician for the Labour Party. Since 2009, she has been a member of parliament for Nord-Trøndelag.
Bratli was born of Olle Andersson and Røydis Rebnord. She went to Namsos Primary and Lower Secondary School from 1973 to 1982, and took general studies at Namsos Upper Secondary School from 1982 to 1985. She worked as a sales clerk at the hardware store Bygger'n in Grong from 1985 to 1996.

She was leader of Overhalla Labour Party from 1989 to 1994, and was a member of the municipal council of Overhalla for three terms from 1991 to 2003, the last eight years as a member of the executive board. She was leader of Nord-Trøndelag Labour Party from 1995 to 1997, and sat on the central board of the Norwegian Labour Party from 1996 to 2000. She was elected to Nord-Trøndelag County Council in 1995, and was re-elected on three occasions. She worked as the group secretary from 1998 to 2003, when she was appointed councilor of commerce, transport and the environment in the county cabinet. Following the 2007 election, she became councilor of regional development. From 1 May to 1 November 2003, she was mayor of Overhalla. From 2001 to 2006, she was chair of the Norwegian Council for Road Safety.

Bratli was elected to the parliament following the 2009 election as the Labour Party's third representative from Nord-Trøndelag. She sits in the Standing Committee on Transport and Communications.

Further reading

Labour Party (Norway) politicians
Members of the Storting
Mayors of places in Nord-Trøndelag
People from Namsos
People from Overhalla
1966 births
Living people
21st-century Norwegian politicians